Brassia macrostachya is a species of orchid native to Venezuela and Guyana.

The plant is listed is "vulnerable" according to the Venezuelan "Red Book".

References

macrostachya
Orchids of Venezuela
Orchids of Guyana
Plants described in 1838